Bannon was an unincorporated community in Apache County, Arizona, United States. It is now a ghost town.

History
A post office called Bannon was established in 1920, and remained in operation until 1942. The community has the name of James Bannon, a pioneer citizen.

References

Unincorporated communities in Apache County, Arizona
Unincorporated communities in Arizona